Timeline of the COVID-19 pandemic in the India may refer to:

 Timeline of the COVID-19 pandemic in India (January–May 2020)
 Timeline of the COVID-19 pandemic in India (June–December 2020)
 Timeline of the COVID-19 pandemic in India (2021)
 Timeline of the COVID-19 pandemic in India (2022)

 
India